Canoeing events have been contested at every Asian Games since 1990 Asian Games in Beijing.

Editions

Events

Slalom

Sprint

Medal table

Participating nations

List of medalists

See also
 Canoe polo at the 2018 Asian Games

External links 
 Asian Canoe Confederation
 Results

 
Sports at the Asian Games
Asian Games
Canoeing in Asia